Abacetus drimostomoides is a species of ground beetle in the subfamily Pterostichinae. It was described by Chaudoir in 1869.

References

drimostomoides
Beetles described in 1869